Calandula Falls (formerly known as Duque de Bragança Falls) are waterfalls in the municipality of Calandula, Malanje Province, Angola. They are one of the largest waterfalls by volume in Africa. The distance from Luanda is 360 km.

See also
List of waterfalls by flow rate

References

External links

Tourist attractions in Angola
Waterfalls of Angola
Malanje Province